Lower.com Field is a soccer-specific stadium in Columbus, Ohio, United States. It serves primarily as the home stadium of the Columbus Crew of Major League Soccer, replacing the club's previous home, Historic Crew Stadium. The new stadium cost $314 million and is located at the center of the mixed-use Astor Park development adjacent to the Arena District and downtown. It seats 20,371 spectators and includes 30 suites and 1,900 club seats.

History

Construction on the new stadium was originally scheduled to begin in the summer of 2019; groundbreaking was later rescheduled to October 10, 2019. Once the new stadium is complete, Historic Crew Stadium will be redeveloped into the training center of Columbus Crew, as well as a community sports park.

On June 15, 2021, the Crew announced that Columbus-based online real estate company Lower.com had purchased the naming rights to the stadium; per team policy, terms were not disclosed.

The first game in Lower.com Field was on July 3, 2021, and resulted in a 2–2 draw between the Crew and the New England Revolution. Parts of the stadium were still under construction at the time. The first goal in stadium history was scored by Tajon Buchanan of New England; Columbus' first goal was scored by Gyasi Zardes during the same match. On July 17, 2021, the Crew earned their first win at Lower.com Field with a 2–1 victory over New York City FC.

The stadium is owned by the Confluence Community Authority (CCA), a special district governed by the City of Columbus and Franklin County. The Crew have a 30-year lease with the CCA with an annual rent of $10 and an option to purchase the stadium outright in 2047 for 30 percent of its market value.

International matches

Men's matches

Women's matches

References

External links

 
 

Major League Soccer stadiums
Soccer venues in Ohio
Sports venues in Columbus, Ohio
Columbus Crew
Sports venues completed in 2021
2021 establishments in Ohio